Parviz Zafari is an Iranian pan-Iranist politician who served as a member of parliament from 1975 to 1979. He resigned from the Resurgence Party in June 1978.

References 

Pan-Iranist Party politicians
Rastakhiz Party politicians
Members of the 24th Iranian Majlis
Iranian nationalists